Eleutherodactylus weinlandi is a species of frog in the family Eleutherodactylidae endemic to eastern Hispaniola; it is found in the Dominican Republic and central Haiti. It is a common, terrestrial frog that occurs in a range of mesic habitats: plantations, woods, gardens, ravines, and even trash piles in urban areas.

References

weinlandi
Endemic fauna of Hispaniola
Amphibians of the Dominican Republic
Amphibians of Haiti
Amphibians described in 1914
Taxa named by Thomas Barbour
Taxonomy articles created by Polbot